Jessica Dromgoole is a British director of contemporary theatre and radio-plays, as well as a former Artistic Director of the Finborough Theatre from 1988 to 1991. In 1991 she became New Writing Co-ordinator for BBC Drama, Entertainment and Children's programmes.

Early life
Dromgoole is the daughter of schoolteacher Jenny Davis and Patrick Dromgoole, a former managing director of Harlech Television. Dromgoole is the older sister of Dominic Dromgoole and Sean Dromgoole.

Selected awards

Radio plays

Notes

Sources
 Jessica Dromgoole's radio play listing at Diversity (suttonelms.org.uk)
 Jessica Dromgoole's radio play listing at RadioListings

References

External links
 

BBC Radio drama directors
BBC radio producers
British theatre directors
Living people
Prix Italia winners
Year of birth missing (living people)
Women radio producers